Amine Chermiti (born 26 December 1987) is a Tunisian professional footballer who plays as a striker.

Club career
Chermiti was mentioned as one of the African players of the year due to his performance in the African Champions League, where he scored eight goals in the tournament. He is credited for Étoile Sahel's superb performance in the AFC Champions League.

On 6 August 2008, he officially transferred to Hertha BSC and played his first match for them the following day in the first round of the German Cup. On 11 August 2009, Chermiti was loaned to Saudi Arabian top club Al-Ittihad for one year and returned on 30 June 2010.

On 5 July 2010, Chermiti signed a four-year contract with FC Zürich until summer 2014.

On 29 January 2016, Chermiti signed with Gazélec Ajaccio on a one-year contract, with an option for a further year.

He then signed for Saudi Arabian club Al-Fayha in January 2019, and played seven games in the season without scoring.

In August 2019, he signed for Indian Super League club Mumbai City FC. He started in their opening game, and scored the winning goal as they won 1–0 against Kerala Blasters.

International career
He was a member of the Tunisia national football team.

Personal life
Chermiti's cousin Youssef Chermiti is a Portuguese professional footballer.

Career statistics
Scores and results list Tunisia's goal tally first, score column indicates score after each Chermiti goal.

References

External links
 
 
 
 

1987 births
Living people
People from Sfax
Footballers from Tunis
Tunisian footballers
Association football forwards
Tunisia international footballers
2008 Africa Cup of Nations players
2010 Africa Cup of Nations players
2012 Africa Cup of Nations players
2015 Africa Cup of Nations players
Bundesliga players
Swiss Super League players
Saudi Professional League players
Kuwait Premier League players
Étoile Sportive du Sahel players
Hertha BSC players
Ittihad FC players
FC Zürich players
Al-Arabi SC (Kuwait) players
JS Kairouan players
Al-Fayha FC players
Tunisian expatriate footballers
Tunisian expatriate sportspeople in Germany
Expatriate footballers in Germany
Tunisian expatriate sportspeople in Saudi Arabia
Expatriate footballers in Saudi Arabia
Tunisian expatriate sportspeople in Switzerland
Expatriate footballers in Switzerland
Tunisian expatriate sportspeople in India
Expatriate footballers in India
Tunisian expatriate sportspeople in Kuwait
Expatriate footballers in Kuwait